Wootton is a civil parish in the district of East Staffordshire, Staffordshire, England.  The parish contains eight listed buildings that are recorded in the National Heritage List for England.  All the listed buildings are designated at Grade II, the lowest of the three grades, which is applied to "buildings of national importance and special interest".  The parish contains the village of Wootton and the surrounding countryside.  The listed buildings consist of farmhouses, farm buildings, cottages, and a milepost.


Buildings

Notes and references

Notes

Citations

Sources

Lists of listed buildings in Staffordshire